Hunts Point station is a planned passenger rail station on the New Haven Line of the Metro-North Railroad New Haven Line, to be located in Hunts Point, Bronx. The station is planned to open in 2027 as part of the Penn Station Access project, which will add four stations in The Bronx. The station will be located north of Hunts Point Avenue, behind the former New York, New Haven and Hartford Railroad station, which was designed by Cass Gilbert.

A 63-month design-build contract for the project was issued in December 2021.

References

Cass Gilbert buildings
Hunts Point, Bronx
Metro-North Railroad stations in New York City
Railway stations in the Bronx
Railway stations scheduled to open in 2027
Stations along New York, New Haven and Hartford Railroad lines
Stations on the Northeast Corridor